The N709 or Khulna City Bypass is a National Highway in Bangladesh. It connects Khulna with Mongla via Khan Jahan Ali Bridge.

Junction and important places

 Afil Gate
 Chingrikhali Bazar
 Teligati
 Arongghata
 Mostafa More
 Bil Pabla
 Khulna Jail
 Zero Point
 Mohammad Nagar
 Khan Jahan Ali Bridge
 Kudir Bottola

References

National Highways in Bangladesh